Mosteni may refer to:
 Moșteni, in Romania
 Mosteni (Lydia), a town of ancient Lydia now in Turkey